Acanthophippium splendidum is a species of flowering plant in the family Orchidaceae, native to parts of Malesia (the Maluku Islands and Sulawesi), Papuasia (New Guinea and the Solomon Islands (archipelago)) and islands in the south-western Pacific Ocean (Fiji, New Caledonia, Samoa, Tonga, Vanuatu and Wallis and Futuna). It was first described by Johannes Jacobus Smith in 1933.

References

splendidum
Flora of the Maluku Islands
Flora of Sulawesi
Flora of New Guinea
Flora of the Solomon Islands (archipelago)
Flora of Fiji
Flora of New Caledonia
Flora of Samoa
Flora of Tonga
Flora of Vanuatu
Flora of Wallis and Futuna
Orchids of Vanuatu
Plants described in 1933